Cherry Valley Creek may refer to:

Cherry Valley Creek (Missouri)
Cherry Valley Creek (New York)